Danneel Ackles ( Elta Danneel Graul; March 18, 1979), credited professionally before 2012 as Danneel Harris, is an American actress and model. She played the role of Shannon McBain on the American daytime soap opera One Life to Live and Rachel Gatina on the WB/CW television drama series One Tree Hill.

Early life
Elta Danneel Graul was born in Lafayette, Louisiana and raised in nearby Eunice, a small town in St. Landry Parish. Her father Edward E. Graul Jr. is a practicing ophthalmologist and her mother Deborah Graul works as an interior designer. She was named after her great-grandmother. Her first name is Elta, but she goes by her middle name, Danneel, professionally. The name "Danneel" was inspired by Danneel Street in New Orleans. She moved to Los Angeles to pursue a modeling career.

Career

Modeling and acting
Before she landed her first acting role, Harris worked as a model with such companies as Big Sexy Hair and Juicy Jeans. She first appeared in a television commercial. In 2003, Harris landed her first role on the American Broadcasting Company Soap Opera television series One Life to Live as Shannon McBain, a student attending the fictional Llanview University. Harris relocated to New York for the role, and left the series in December 2004. Harris has since gone on to appear in shows such as JAG, Charmed, CSI: Crime Scene Investigation, What I Like About You, NCIS, and Joey. Harris's first film role was in the short film The Plight of Clownana.

In 2005, Harris was announced to have a major recurring role in the third season of The CW television drama series One Tree Hill. Harris portrayed the role of Rachel Gatina, a bad girl who creates havoc for the residents of Tree Hill and returned to her role as a series regular for the show's fourth season. However, in season five Harris only reprises the role of Rachel in two episodes due to the seasons format change. In June 2009, Harris was confirmed to reprise the role of Rachel in the series seventh season over the course of seven episodes. Harris was in-talks to return for the series eighth season, but, due to scheduling conflicts, these plans never materialized.

In January 2007, Harris was cast as the female lead in the New Line Cinema Comedy film Harold & Kumar Escape from Guantanamo Bay, the sequel to the 2004 film Harold & Kumar Go to White Castle. Filming took place in Shreveport, Louisiana, that same month. The film was released in April 2008 to mostly negative reviews (with aggregator website Rotten Tomatoes giving it an average of 53%), despite the film grossing over $43,439,123 worldwide. Harris reprises the role of Vanessa Fanning in the third and final installment of the trilogy, A Very Harold & Kumar 3D Christmas, which was released in November 2011. In both 2009 and 2010, Harris had small supporting roles in the films Fired Up! and The Back-up Plan.

In May 2009, Harris was announced to have been cast in the Screen Gems Thriller film The Roommate. The film, also starring Leighton Meester and Cam Gigandet, centers on a college freshman whose roommate has a violent obsession with her. Harris portrays Irene Crew, a high-profile fashion designer. The film was shot on location at the University of Southern California in Los Angeles, and suffered numerous push-backs for unknown reasons. The film was eventually released in February 2011 to a $15.6 million opening weekend despite negative reviews from critics and went on to gross over $40 million worldwide.

In September 2009, Harris appeared in the sitcom television series pilot Friends with Benefits, which was picked up by NBC. It was originally set to air as a midseason replacement during the 2010–11 television season, but was delayed until August 2011. Harris took on the role of Sara Maxwell, a doctor desperate to find the right guy. The series premiered to a low 2.34 million viewers and to mixed reviews from critics. The rest of the season's inability to retain viewers guaranteed that the series was not renewed.

In June 2012, Harris, now going by the professional name Danneel Ackles, was brought in for a recurring role in the second season of the TV Land series Retired at 35. In December 2017 it was announced that Ackles had been cast in the recurring role of Sister Jo in thirteenth season of The CW television series Supernatural. She appeared in a Lifetime television film, The Christmas Contract (2018), alongside former One Tree Hill co-stars Hilarie Burton, Robert Buckley, Tyler Hilton and Antwon Tanner. More recently, Jensen and Danneel Ackles formed Chaos Machine Productions with a deal at Warner Bros. Television.

Personal life
Harris became engaged to Supernatural actor Jensen Ackles in November 2009 and the couple married on May 15, 2010, in Dallas, Texas. It was announced on January 7, 2013, that the couple were expecting their first child together. Their daughter was born in May 2013. On August 10, 2016, the couple announced that they were expecting twins together, later in the year. Their twins, a son and a daughter, were born in December 2016.

Filmography

Film

Television

References

External links
 

1979 births
Actresses from Louisiana
American film actresses
American television actresses
Living people
People from Eunice, Louisiana
21st-century American actresses
Female models from Louisiana